Dagenham Heathway is a London Underground station serving the town of Dagenham in the London Borough of Barking and Dagenham, east London.

History
The station was opened on 12 September 1932. The station was constructed and initially operated by the London, Midland and Scottish Railway with services provided by the District line from the outset. The station was called Heathway when it first opened, changing to its present name in 1949.

Design
The 1930s station buildings were extensively refurbished during 2005 and 2006.

Services
Typical off-peak service from the station is:

12 tph (trains per hour) east to Upminster
6 tph west to Ealing Broadway
6 tph west to Richmond

Connections
London Buses routes 145, 173, 174, 175, 364 and school route 673 serve the station.

References

District line stations
Tube stations in the London Borough of Barking and Dagenham
Former London, Midland and Scottish Railway stations
Railway stations in Great Britain opened in 1932
Dagenham